George Scratchley Brown  (August 17th 1918 – December 5th 1978) was a United States Air Force general who served as the eighth chairman of the Joint Chiefs of Staff. In this capacity, he served as the senior military adviser to the president of the United States, the National Security Council and the secretary of defense. Through the commanders of the unified and specified commands, he was also responsible for executing the decisions of the National Command Authorities regarding worldwide readiness and employment of combat forces of the United States Army, Navy, Air Force and Marine Corps.

Early life
George Scratchley Brown was born in Montclair, New Jersey, on 17 August 1918, the son of Thoburn Kaye Brown, an Army officer who had graduated with the West Point class of 1913, and his wife Frances Katherine née Scratchley. As an Army brat, Brown lived in a succession of different towns and military bases. He was an Eagle Scout, and played on the American football varsity team as a freshman at Fort Brown, Texas. He later was a fullback during his junior and senior years at Immaculata High School in Fort Leavenworth, Kansas, and was an all-league in the Catholic high school interstate league.

Both Brown and his younger brother Tim set their sights on attending West Point, but their father advised taking a year of college first. Therefore, after graduating from high school in 1936, Brown enrolled in engineering at the University of Missouri where he joined Sigma Alpha Epsilon. A fine horseman, he played polo. He also enlisted in the 128th Field Artillery Battalion of the Missouri National Guard, rising to the rank of corporal. His father was able to secure a congressional appointment to the United States Military Academy from Kansas for him, and Brown entered on 1 July 1937.

At West Point, Brown was roommates with John Norton, future US Army lieutenant general. Brown once again played polo, and was captain of the team in his senior year, when the West Point team lost in the final to Princeton University. In that year he was also cadet captain and regimental adjutant. He would have liked to have joined the cavalry on graduation like his father, but his standing as 342nd in his class was too low for an appointment to the cavalry. Instead, he was commissioned as a second lieutenant in the infantry on graduation on 11 June 1941. However, he volunteered for Air Corps training. At West Point he met Alice (Skip) Colhoun. An Army brat like himself, Alice met Brown at a party her father had thrown for the sons of the graduates of the class of 1913. Brown and Alice dated for over a year, and were married in 1942. Their marriage produced three children, two boys and a girl.

World War II

Brown commenced his basic flight training in Fairchild PT-19s at Pine Bluff, Arkansas on 20 August 1941. He then went to Randolph Field, Texas, for the second phase of his training. The third and final phase was completed at Kelly Field, Texas, where he received his pilot's wings on 7 March 1942. He officially transferred to the Air Corps on 4 April 1942, and was promoted to first lieutenant on 18 June 1942. His first assignment after flight training was at Barksdale Field, Louisiana, where, as a member of the 344th Bombardment Squadron of the 93d Bombardment Group, he flew the Consolidated B-24 Liberator. Moving with the organization to Fort Myers, Florida, he flew both antisubmarine patrol and conventional bomber training aircraft.

In August 1942, he flew with the 93d Bombardment Group to England, where it became the first B-24 group to join the Eighth Air Force. He served in various positions with the group, including commander of the 329th Bombardment Squadron, group operations officer and group executive officer. He was promoted to captain on 20 October, major on 13 February 1943, and lieutenant colonel on 27 August 1943. High casualties and the rapid expansion of the Air Force paved the way for fast promotion, which Brown's superiors felt was deserved due to his outstanding performance in combat and leadership skills. Perhaps no one was as surprised at his rapid advance in rank as his father, now a brigadier general, who was serving in North Africa at the time Brown arrived there with the 93d Bombardment Group when it was temporarily detached from the Eighth Air Force. The elder Brown wanted to know "What's a young whippersnapper like you doing as a colonel?!"

It was as executive officer that he took part in Operation Tidal Wave, the low-level bombing raid against oil refineries at Ploieşti, Romania, on 1 August 1943. The 93d Bombardment Group was the second of five B-24 groups that raided Ploieşti from a temporary base at Benghazi, Libya. It flew directly into heavy defenses to attack three of the six target refineries. The lead plane, flown by the group commander, Lieutenant Colonel Addison Baker, was shot down. Brown took over the command of the battered 93d and led it through the attack on the target and the journey back to Benghazi. He received the Distinguished Service Cross for his actions on that mission. For his services in combat in the skies over Europe, he was also awarded the Silver Star, two Distinguished Flying Crosses, three Air Medals, the French Croix de guerre with palm and the British Distinguished Flying Cross.

Brown was appointed assistant operations officer, 2d Air Division on 8 April 1944. He was promoted to colonel on 1 October. Having completed the required 25 missions, he was rotated back to the United States on 9 November. Alice was shocked to discover "that guy of mine had in fact requested another overseas assignment. He was so gung ho that he had come home, checked on me, and without my knowing it, put in to go back for another tour." However, the Air Force turned down the request. On 27 January 1945, Brown became Deputy Assistant Chief of Staff A-3 with the Air Training Command at Fort Worth, Texas.

Cold War and later career 

In February 1946, Brown was posted to the Operations Division of the Air Training Command at Barksdale Field, Louisiana, where he served under Major General Alvin C. Kincaid and his Assistant Chief of Staff for Operations, Brigadier General Thomas C. Darcy. For the first time, Brown received a mediocre effectiveness report. In December 1946 he joined Headquarters Air Defense Command at Mitchel Field, New York, as assistant to Air Chief of Staff, Operations, and later as chief of its ROTC branch. On 1 July 1947 he became assistant deputy for operations.

Brown became commander of the 62d Troop Carrier Group at McChord Air Force Base, Washington, on 17 July 1950. This group operated Douglas C-124 Globemaster II and Fairchild C-119 Flying Boxcar aircraft between the West Coast and Japan. With the outbreak of the Korean War in June 1950, this mission acquired great importance. In July 1951 he assumed command of the 56th Fighter Interceptor Wing at Selfridge Air Force Base, Michigan, part of the Air Defense Command, although he had never flown fighters before. He learned to fly the Lockheed T-33 Shooting Star, North American F-86 Sabre and Lockheed F-94 Starfire. On 1 January 1952 Brown became assistant director of operations of the Fifth Air Force in South Korea. He became Director on 15 July 1952.

Brown returned to the United States where he assumed command of the 3525th Pilot Training Wing at Williams Air Force Base, Arizona, on 6 June 1953. He entered the National War College in August 1956. It was the first and only service school he attended after graduating from West Point. After graduation in June 1957, he served as executive to the Chief of Staff of the United States Air Force, General Thomas D. White. Brown was promoted to brigadier general in August 1959. He was selected to be military assistant to the Secretary of Defense, Thomas S. Gates Jr., and then to the new Secretary of Defense, Robert MacNamara, with the rank of major general.

Brown became commander of the Eastern Transport Air Force at McGuire Air Force Base, New Jersey, in August 1963. In September 1964, he was selected to organize and command Joint Task Force 2, a Joint Chiefs of Staff unit formed at Sandia Base, New Mexico, to the test weapon systems of all the military services in order to avoid wasteful duplication of effort. It was staffed by personnel of all three services. In May 1966 he became the Assistant to the Chairman of the Joint Chiefs of Staff, General Earle G. Wheeler, on the recommendation of his predecessor in the role, Lieutenant General Andrew Goodpaster. Brown was promoted to the same rank on 1 August 1966. The preoccupation of the Joint Chiefs at this time was the Vietnam War, but he was also involved in the handling of the Pueblo crisis.

On 1 August 1968, Brown assumed command of the Seventh Air Force and also became deputy commander for air operations, U.S. Military Assistance Command Vietnam (MACV), with the rank of general. As Seventh Air Force commander, he was responsible for all Air Force combat air strike, air support and air defense operations in Southeast Asia. In his MACV position, he advised on all matters pertaining to tactical air support and coordinated the Republic of Vietnam and United States air operations in the MACV area of responsibility. According to Goodpaster, Brown and MACV commander General Creighton Abrams "were like two brothers". General George F. Keegan felt that:

Brown's tour of Vietnam ended in September 1970, and he became Commander, Air Force Systems Command, with headquarters at Andrews Air Force Base, Maryland. This job involved handling a number of troublesome projects, including the F-111.

Chief of Staff of the United States Air Force 

In 1973, under the recommendation of the Secretary of the Air Force, Robert Seamans and Secretary of Defense, James R. Schlesinger, President Richard Nixon appointed Brown to be Chief of Staff of the United States Air Force, effective 1 August 1973. General Brown became the first Air Force chief of staff who had previously never held the position of Air Force vice chief of staff. Brown was successful in building his character and leadership, mostly during his time as a general officer, and his tenure at several high-ranking positions had made him the favored choice for higher position within the military for quite some time. According to Brown biography book "Destined for Stars" written by Edgar F. Puryear, Jr. several high-ranking people within the military and government officials had predicted that Brown someday would achieve a higher position within the military, such as Brown predecessor General John D. Ryan who informed Brown that he was his favorite choice to succeed him as Air Force Chief of Staff after Ryan assumed the Air Force Chief of Staff position in August 1969.

General George S. Brown was sworn in as the eighth Chief of Staff of the United States Air Force on August 1, 1973. In this capacity Brown oversaw all United States major operations both domestic and international and all Air Force related projects, such as the development of the new fighter and bomber aircraft project which resulted in the F-15 and F-16 fighter aircraft and the B-1B strategic bomber aircraft. Brown emphasized the need of the modernization of United States Air Force Aircraft fleet following the Vietnam War and for the long-term future, in order to deter the growing Soviet weapon arsenal. Brown also emphasized the important role of Strategic Air Command as United States primary nuclear deterrence. Brown also emphasized the need of a new and modern missile that could strengthen the ballistic-missile as part of the Nuclear Triad, as a result the Air Force began the development of the new MX missiles.

During his tenure as Air Force Chief of Staff, Brown also wanted to create a new and different relationship with his fellow Air Force personnel, unlike his predecessor and asking them not to hesitate to suggest new ideas for the Air Force. One of Brown's primary focus in reshaping and modernize the Air Force, is that not only focusing on the aircraft, weapons and material, but also with its own personnel and people within the Air Force especially the morale and spiritual welfare. During his tenure as Air Force Chief of Staff Brown also asked all the personnel to participate at all major religion event, such as the prayer for the release of the U.S. Military personnel that was held as Prisoner of War (POW) in Vietnam. During the Worldwide Commanders' Conference, Brown also called upon the personnel for a prayer on every occasion. Brown also often visited Air Force facility such as the Lackland Air Force Base where the new Airmen get its training and greeted them and joining them for lunch, which was depicted in the Air Force Now Movies series. Brown kept and maintained his relations with every Air Force personnel and didn't put a gap between him and other air force personnel including the junior personnel.

An avid Aviator, Brown always spent time in the cockpit as its pilot and despite his busy schedule and time-consuming duties as Air Force Chief of Staff, General Brown always maintained his primary interest and proficiency as a Pilot. At one occasion Brown always flew the Air Force Aircraft that was used primarily for official trips such as Lockheed VC-140B Jetstar, North American T-39 Sabreliner and Boeing C-135 Speckled Trout. At some point when Brown was on official trips with Senator Barry Goldwater who was also a Major General within the United States Air Force Reserve and an avid Aviator himself, Brown flew together in the cockpit with Senator Barry Goldwater.

However, Brown did not remain as Air Force Chief of Staff for long. He was appointed Chairman of the Joint Chiefs of Staff effective 1 July 1974. When Brown was nominated as Chairman of the Joint Chiefs of Staff, many Air Force personnel feel sad that Brown have to leave the Air Force to head the Joint Chiefs of Staff and the nation's highest-ranking military position, due to many Air Force personnel feeling that Brown was deeply needed within the Air Force. Brown was considered by many of the Air Force personnel as the "Brain" of the Air Force who brought so many idea and contribution within the Air Force that eventually led to the modernization of the Air Force.

Chairman of the Joint Chiefs of Staff 

In 1974, following the Admiral Thomas Moorer scheduled for retirement as Chairman of the Joint Chiefs of Staff, Brown was tapped by President Richard Nixon and Secretary of Defense James Schlesinger to succeed Moorer as Chairman of the Joint Chiefs of Staff. Many including former Secretary of Defense Robert McNamara whom Brown once work with as his military assistant has predicted that Brown would someday be Chairman of the Joint Chiefs of Staff. According to General Robert J. Dixon who once served and a protégé of Air Force Chief of Staff General Thomas D. White, when White was lying ill in the hospital due to terminal leukemia in 1964, General White tell General Dixon to congratulate George S. Brown on behalf of General White if someday Brown becomes Chairman of the Joint Chiefs of Staff. A prophecy of General Thomas D. White which eventually become true ten years later and what was also told on Brown Biography book "Destined for Stars" written by Edgar F. Puryear, Jr.

George S. Brown was sworn in as Chairman of the Joint Chiefs of Staff is sworn in as Chairman of The Joint Chiefs of Staff by Department of Defense General Counsel Martin Hoffman in a ceremony held in the Pentagon on July 1, 1974, which was attend by Secretary of Defense James Schlesinger and President Richard Nixon. In this capacity, Brown is now the highest-ranking and most senior military officer within the United States Armed Forces and is also the principal military advisor to the President, Secretary of Defense and the national Security Council. Brown also become the first Air Force General to held the position Chairman of the Joint Chiefs of Staff, following the 14 years hiatus of Air Force General within the Chairman of the Joint Chiefs of Staff position, since General Nathan F. Twining retired as Chairman of the Joint Chiefs of Staff on August 15, 1960.

However, not long after Brown assuming the Chairman of the Joint Chiefs of Staff position, President Richard Nixon who appointed Brown as Chairman of the Joint Chiefs of Staff had to resign from the presidency due to the Watergate Scandal and was succeeded by his Vice President Gerald Ford who assumed the presidency following Nixon resignation. Brown attended Nixon departure at the White House Lawn on August 9, 1974, as well as Gerald Ford's inauguration ceremony as president.

As Chairman, Brown was responsible for handling notable international event such as Turkish invasion of Cyprus in 1974, and the Mayaguez incident, the final act of the war in Vietnam in 1975. He also dealt with the 1976 shootings and Axe Murder Incident in the Korean Demilitarized Zone, and oversaw the Panama Canal Treaty in 1977.One of Brown primary duties as Chairman of the Joint Chiefs of Staff was the recasting and reshaping of the leadership within the Joint Staff. One of Brown primary action as in reshaping the leadership within the Joint Staff was by eliminating the J-2 which was basically responsible for communications function and combining it with the J-3 operations. Brown also gave a chance to his fellow Joint Chiefs of Staff members such as the Air Force Chief of Staff, the Chief of Naval Operations, the Commandant of the Marine Corps and the Army Chief of Staff to handle crisis situation, in order to prepare them in case they were chosen to be the next Chairman of the Joint Chiefs of Staff. One notable cases is during the Mayaguez incident, in which at that time Brown was on official foreign trips to attend NATO summit in Europe, in which at that time Brown allowed Air Force Chief of Staff General David C. Jones to act as the acting Chairman of the Joint Chiefs of Staff and led the discussion within the National Security Council on the military planning and military matters to execute the operations to save the crew of SS Mayaguez. As a result, Jones later was appointed as Chairman of the Joint Chiefs of Staff, succeeding Brown in 1978 and Jones experience as acting Chairman of the Joint Chiefs of Staff during the Mayaguez incident that led to Jones effort to modernize the scope of the military to improve its relations with the civilian leadership that eventually led to the Military Reform act in 1986 that was famously known as the Goldwater–Nichols Act.

Brown also asserted the importance of military modernization following the Vietnam War and to prepare for the modern challenge, including the modernization of Air Force aircraft fleet and continuing Brown's policy during his tenure as Air Force Chief of Staff. Brown described Soviet as a "clear and present danger" and believes that the Soviet is trying to buildup its military arsenal. Brown also assert that in order to prepare for the worst-case scenario such as event like "First Strike" the United States therefore must be ready at anytime and any-event and would eventually deter whatever worst-case situation that eventually will come-up in the future. Part of this Brown continue his effort to buildup the Strategic Air Command Nuclear Triad arsenal that Brown already started during his tenure as Air Force Chief of Staff and emphasize the need of a new and modern bomber aircraft such as the B-1B Strategic Bomber Aircraft and the new MX Intercontinental Ballistic Missile. Together with Secretary of Defense James Schlesinger Brown began the study and development for a new and sophisticated weapon to deter any possible threat in the future. However following the new Détente policy that was adopted in the early 1970s, Brown also adjust how to keep the United States Military always in robust shape and always ready all the time while following the Détente policy. Part of the Détente policy was the Strategic Arms Limitation Talks treaty or also known as SALT treaty which has already started in 1972, two years before Brown assuming the Chairman of the Joint Chiefs of Staff Position. Working together with Secretary of Defense James Schlesinger, Brown re-asserted that although both United States and Soviet had begun to talk for Détente and SALT treaty but always still be ready at any time and to prevent an event that eventually could lead to a major crisis and escalate the tension between United States and the Soviet Union.

In November 1975, following James Schlesinger's retirement as Secretary of Defense and replacement by Donald Rumsfeld, Brown worked together with Rumsfeld to re-assert United States policy on military buildup and Détente. Both Rumsfeld and Brown agreed to work to speed up the B-1B Bombers Program in order to make B-1B Bomber Aircraft ready for service within the United States Air Force as soon as possible. Together with Secretary of Defense Donald Rumsfeld, Brown tested the B-1B Aircraft on a flight-test in 1975 along with Rumsfeld. Another part that Brown and Rumsfeld agreed was the new Fighter Aircraft program to modernize Air Force Tactical-Fighter Aircraft and to replace some Air Force aircraft that was considered obsolete. As a result, the Air Force finally receive the new Tactical-Fighter Aircraft, F-15 and F-16, although the program has been studied during Brown's tenure as Air Force Chief of Staff along with Air Force Secretary Robert Seamans.

Following the SALT I Treaty Talk in 1972, the Ford administration which continued the Nixon Administration Détente policy began the SALT II Treaty Talk. Ford tried to had the SALT II Treaty Talk before the 1976 Presidential Election and ask the Defense Department to immediately come-up with the important point for the SALT II Treaty. Together with Secretary of Defense Donald Rumsfeld, Brown worked together to develop the important point for SALT II Treaty. However the SALT II Treaty important points doesn't come up due to several disagreements and failed to meet its deadline before the 1976 election. The Treaty was eventually signed in 1979 during the Carter administration.

Brown who was known for speaking frankly and forthright eventually causing some of his speech got heavily criticized during his term as chairman. The event happened when Brown commented on two occasions—firstly to a Duke University audience in October 1974, and then to a French reporter in 1976—that Israel was becoming a burden to the Pentagon and that he believed the reason for continual military aid was due to Jews having control over America's banks, newspapers and elected officials. His exact words were:
Brown's comments at Duke and subsequent reprimand by President Gerald Ford were reported on the front page of The Washington Post on 13 and 14 November 1974. There was speculation that Brown would be asked to resign, or at least not be nominated for a second two-year term; but he was re-nominated and went on to serve under the new president, Jimmy Carter.

In April 1976 during an interview with Ranan Lurie, a cartoonist for Newsweek, Brown was asked to comment on his opinion of the British Armed Forces, Brown replied, "They're no longer a world power. All they've got are generals, admirals and bands." Reaction in Britain was mixed. Some, like Lord Allenby condemned Brown's remarks, while others, like Lord Monckton acknowledged the truth of the remarks. Brown also said that Israel was a "burden" to the United States, and predicted that Iran would become an important military power in the Middle East. The event that cause a sparked of controversy especially in the middle of a presidential election was eventually resolved by Secretary of Defense Donald Rumsfeld and Brown himself, who immediately apologize for the remark. Both Brown and Rumsfeld held a press conference in The Pentagon to reaffirm that the statement was actually a mistake. Some even speculated that the statement was actually leaked by the opposition site to take advantage during the election, in which Brown replied to the reporter that "I'm not in a position to judge" and Rumsfeld also replied "He's not in a position to judge, he's exactly right I agree with him completely."

Evacuation of Saigon 

One of the most important events during Brown's tenure as Chairman of the Joint Chiefs of Staff was the evacuation of Saigon after North Vietnamese troops defeated South Vietnamese troops in battles fought during the 1975 Spring Offensive, occupied many South Vietnamese cities and marched towards Saigon, the capital city of South Vietnam. Brown advised the National Security Council by the end of March 1975 that the United States should immediately begin the evacuation of American citizens that were still left in Saigon and other South Vietnam cities. Brown eventually oversaw the military operations to evacuate U.S. citizens in Saigon. He organized the military's tactical airlift aircraft in coordination with Air Force Chief of Staff General David C. Jones to evacuate American citizens out of Saigon as soon as possible. The operations also used several commercial aircraft to accelerate the evacuation. The operations were focused on Tan Son Nhat Airport in Saigon, which was the only primary airport left in South Vietnam following Da Nang's fall to the North Vietnamese Army. One of Brown's messages to all military personnel involved in the operations was a message to not leave anyone behind.

However, on 28 April 1975, Tan Son Nhat Airport came under heavy artillery fire and an attack from the North Vietnamese Air Force that eventually crippled the airport. Brown therefore briefed President Gerald Ford, Secretary of Defense James Schlesinger and the National Security Council on how to continue the evacuation following the attack on Tan Son Nhat Airport; his briefing took into account that there were no airports that were still under South Vietnamese jurisdiction. Brown and the Joint Chiefs of Staff came up with the idea of an evacuation that primarily involved helicopters. As a result, Operation Frequent Wind was initiated from 29 April to 30 April 1975. The operation managed to evacuate many people out of Saigon by flying them via helicopters to a nearby United States aircraft carrier in the South China Sea. A CIA-operated airline, Air America, was also involved in Operation Frequent Wind and deployed much of their Huey helicopter fleet. The operation ended on the morning of 30 April 1975 following the evacuation of U.S. Ambassador Graham Martin and the last U.S. Marines in Saigon.

Carter Administration 

Following Gerald Ford's defeat in the 1976 Presidential election and Jimmy Carter assuming the presidency on January 20, 1977, General George S. Brown remained to serve as Chairman of the Joint Chiefs of Staff under Carter Presidency. Before Carter assuming the Presidency, Brown along with Secretary of Defense Donald Rumsfeld already briefed the incoming Carter administration National Security team including Carter appointed Secretary of Defense Harold Brown about all of the important policy that had been taken during Ford administration and shall be continue under Carter administration such as the SALT II Treaty Talk. Brown and Rumsfeld also gave Carter and his incoming National Security team a tour of The Pentagon in December 1976. Brown and Carter new Secretary of Defense Harold Brown worked together on a military policy especially the incoming SALT II Treaty and the continuation of Détente policy.However, there's been some differences take on military matters between Ford and Carter administration in which Brown disagreed with some of it such as Carter campaigned on a pledge to make the Pentagon more efficient, which led to the cancellation of some of importance military modernization program. As a result, the B-1B Program whom Brown is strongly support it, was cancelled under the Carter Administration. Brown also strongly opposed Carter decision to withdraw the United States Military from South Korea May 1977. But at some point Carter and Harold Brown did also agree with Brown about the important role of Strategic Air Command as the nations primary nuclear deterrence. Both Carter and General brown agreed that it was only Strategic Air Command that can anticipate and deter the incoming attack from United States adversary that was known as "First Strike" especially in time of national crisis that could escalate to a major crisis.

During the Carter administration, a talk began with the government of Panama handover the Panama Canal and led to the Panama Canal Treaty. On September 26, 1977, Brown gave a testimony to House Committee on International Relations regarding his opinion on Panama Canal Treaty. Brown's remarks was very essence and Brown also emphasized about the important need of United States use of Canal and instead of ownership. Brown also emphasized that the United States Military must had all the access to the Canal, both in wartime and in peace time and its security must be continually assured. Brown sees that the capability to defend the Panama Canal in order not to fall into the wrong hand was depend on the cooperation between the United States and Panama.

General Brown remained a year within Carter administration, from January 20, 1977, to June 20, 1978. During his last tenure as Chairman of the Joint Chiefs of Staff, Brown continued to advise and emphasize to Carter Administration about the importance of the United States Military arsenal modernization and buildup of its deterrence against the potential threat, even-though Carter administration stressed more on Pentagon Budget reduction. Many of his colleagues on the Department of Defense and the Joint Staff praised Brown leadership during his tenure as Chairman of the Joint Chiefs of Staff, including former Secretary of Defense Donald Rumsfeld who praised Brown as one of the most brilliant and smartest man he ever worked with.

Retirement 
Brown was diagnosed with prostate cancer in early 1978. Although Brown was still able to carry out his duties as Chairman of the Joint Chiefs of Staff, his cancer caused his health to deteriorate, forcing him to take early retirement on 21 June 1978, twelve days before he was due to retire as Chairman of the Joint Chiefs of Staff. Brown was replaced by Air Force Chief of Staff General David C. Jones, who assumed the position on June 21, 1978.

Although he was ill, Brown remained involved in discussions on a number of military matters and appeared on a Public Policy Forum TV program in 1978 to discuss the roles of the Joint Chiefs of Staff along with a former Chairman of the Joint Chiefs of Staff. Brown died at the Malcolm Grow Air Force Hospital at Andrews Air Force Base, Maryland, on 5 December 1978, and was buried in Arlington National Cemetery in Section 21.

Dates of rank 
Source:

Awards and decorations

Distinguished Service Cross citation

Brown, George S.
Major, U.S. Army Air Forces
Headquarters, 93d Bombardment Wing (H), Ninth Air Force (Attached)
Date of Action:  August 1, 1943

Citation:

The President of the United States of America, authorized by Act of Congress July 9, 1918, takes pleasure in presenting the Distinguished Service Cross to Major (Air Corps) George Scratchley Brown, United States Army Air Forces, for extraordinary heroism in connection with military operations against an armed enemy while serving as Squadron Leader and Pilot of a B-24 Heavy Bomber in Headquarters, 93d Bombardment Group (H), Ninth Air Force (Attached), while participating in a bombing mission on 1 August 1943, against the Ploesti Oil Refineries in Rumania. During a long and hazardous attack against a vital enemy oil installation made at low-altitude by a formation of B-24 type aircraft, Major Brown led his Squadron through heavy enemy fire against impossible odds, and then brought his crew safely back to base without the loss of a single man. The personal courage and zealous devotion to duty displayed by Major Brown on this occasion, even when confronted with practically certain destruction, exemplified the highest traditions of the military service and reflects great credit upon himself, the 9th Air Force, and the United States Army Air Forces.

Other honors and recognition
1974, Golden Plate Award of the American Academy of Achievement
1985, The National Aviation Hall of Fame

Gallery

Notes

References

 
 

1918 births
1978 deaths
United States Air Force personnel of the Korean War
United States Air Force personnel of the Vietnam War

United States Army Air Forces bomber pilots of World War II
Chairmen of the Joint Chiefs of Staff
Chiefs of Staff of the United States Air Force
Deaths from prostate cancer
Recipients of the Air Medal
Recipients of the Croix de Guerre 1939–1945 (France)
Recipients of the Distinguished Flying Cross (United States)
Recipients of the Distinguished Flying Cross (United Kingdom)
Recipients of the Distinguished Service Cross (United States)
Recipients of the Defense Distinguished Service Medal
Recipients of the Legion of Merit
Recipients of the National Order of Vietnam
Recipients of the Silver Star
Recipients of the Distinguished Service Order (Vietnam)
Order of National Security Merit members
United States Army Air Forces officers
United States Military Academy alumni
University of Missouri alumni
Burials at Arlington National Cemetery
Missouri National Guard personnel
Recipients of the Air Force Distinguished Service Medal
Recipients of the Navy Distinguished Service Medal
Deaths from cancer in Maryland